New Hampshire elected its members March 10, 1829 after the term began but before Congress convened.

See also 
 1828 and 1829 United States House of Representatives elections
 List of United States representatives from New Hampshire

References
 
 
 
 
 
 

1829
New Hampshire
United States House of Representatives